Pyar Mein Padipoyane is a 2014 Indian Telugu romantic comedy film written and directed by Ravi Chavali, with cinematography by T. Surendra Reddy. It was produced by K. K. Radhamohan under the Sri Sathya Sai Arts banner. It features Aadi and Shanvi Srivastava in the lead roles. The film was released worldwide on 10 May 2014. It was dubbed into Hindi under the same title.

Plot 

Chandra  (Aadi), alias Chinna, and Yuktha (Shanvi) are childhood friends. They lose touch with one another when Chinna and his family move house. Before they leave, Chinna steals something that is of great value to Yuktha, earning her hatred.

After many years, Chinna turns out to be a talented singer, and he comes across Yuktha in his college. He falls in love with her without realising that she is his childhood friend. She turns out to be an aspiring singer too, and as a result, they soon become friends once more.

Chinna has a band named Crazy, and he invites Yuktha to be the lead singer. They come up with some good tunes and they manage to impress the heads of some music companies. Love blossoms between Chinna and Yuktha and everything is fine, until Chinna discovers that Yuktha is the girl whom he befriended when they were children.

He also finds out that Yuktha still has bad feelings about the childhood incident. Chinna tries every trick in the book to make Yuktha forget about it, but he is not successful. He also faces opposition from Ashish, who has his own plans for Yuktha.

What happens in the end? Is what forms the rest of the story of this film.

Cast 
 Aadi as Chandra aka Chinna 
 Shanvi Srivastava as Yukta
 Vennela Kishore as Bobby
 Thagubothu Ramesh
 Prudhviraj
 Y. Kasi Viswanath
 Saptagiri as Husain Verma
 Duvvasi Mohan
 Madhunandan

Soundtrack
This film has eight songs composed by Anup Rubens and lyrics are written by Bhaskarabhatla Ravi Kumar. Music released on 14 April 2014 through Aditya Music and audio launch event took place at Rock Heights in Hyderabad. Actor Manchu Manoj launched its music CDs. Many young stars like Nani, Navdeep, Adith Arun, Varun Sandesh, Sundeep Kishan, Prince, Rakul Preet Singh, Shanvi, Bhimaneni Srinivasa Rao, Saikumar and his wife attended the audio launch.

Reception

The movie received negative reviews from critics. GreatAndhra termed the film as "Passion-less Love Lore". 123telugu.com commented "‘Pyaar Mein Padipoyaane’ is a romantic comedy that has very little romance and very little comedy. In the end, it becomes a boring and routine cinema that should have been made 10 years ago. An ok second half cannot compensate for a very slow first half ".

References 

2014 films
2010s Telugu-language films
Films scored by Anoop Rubens
Films directed by Ravi Chavali